Canton of Les Andelys is a canton of the Arrondissement of Les Andelys in the Eure department of France. The seat lies at Les Andelys.

Communes
At the French canton reorganisation which came into effect in March 2015, the canton was expanded from 20 to 41 communes (17 of which merged into the new communes Vexin-sur-Epte and Frenelles-en-Vexin):

Les Andelys
Bois-Jérôme-Saint-Ouen
Bouafles
Château-sur-Epte
Cuverville
Daubeuf-près-Vatteville
Écouis
Frenelles-en-Vexin
Guiseniers
Harquency
Hennezis
Heubécourt-Haricourt
Heuqueville
Mesnil-Verclives
Mézières-en-Vexin
Muids
Notre-Dame-de-l'Isle
Port-Mort
Pressagny-l'Orgueilleux
La Roquette
Suzay
Thuit
Tilly
Vatteville
Vexin-sur-Epte 
Vézillon

References

Cantons of Eure